Maria Venegas is an American writer, who was born in Mexico. She immigrated to the United States at the age of four. She graduated from Hunter College with an MFA in creative writing, where she was a Hertog Fellow  for Frank McCourt. She currently lives in New York City.

Her memoir Bulletproof Vest received positive reviews from The New York Times, NPR, and Chicago Tribune.

Works
Bulletproof Vest: The Ballad of an Outlaw and His Daughter (2014).

She has also written short stories which have appeared in Granta, The Guardian, and Ploughshares.

References

External links

Living people

Year of birth missing (living people)

American women writers

American writers of Mexican descent
Hunter College alumni
Mexican emigrants to the United States
21st-century American women